Hemidactylus barbouri, also known as Barbour's leaf-toed gecko, is a species of house gecko from coastal Kenya and Tanzania.

References

Hemidactylus
Geckos of Africa
Reptiles of Kenya
Reptiles of Tanzania
Reptiles described in 1942
Taxa named by Arthur Loveridge